Ferenc Nádasdy (1 July 1937 – 15 January 2013) was a Hungarian aristocrat, the last male member of the House of Nádasdy.

Biography
He was born as Count Ferenc Nádasdy de Nádasd et Fogarasföld on 1 July 1937, as the only son of Count Ferenc Mátyás and actress Mária Radó. He had two elder sisters, Júlia Franciska Mária and Katalin. His father was killed in the Second World War on 26 October 1944.

The Communist regime of Hungary prevented him from pursuing his academic studies. As a result, he emigrated to Austria after the Hungarian Revolution of 1956. Later, he moved to Canada, where married Andrea Nikolits de Kékes in Ontario on 10 October 1982. They had no children.

Nádasdy visited Hungary for the first time in 1969. After the end of Communism in Hungary, he returned to his homeland and settled down in Nádasdladány, a former estate of his family. He founded the Nádasdy Foundation in 1991, the aim of which was the cultural preservation of the Nádasdy heritage. He initiated the restoration of the Nádasdy Mansion in 1993.

Nádasdy died after a long illness on 15 January 2013. According to the foundation and the Magyar Távirati Iroda (MTI), he was the last male member of the House of Nádasdy; therefore, the family became extinct after seven centuries.

References

Sources
 Nádasdy Foundation 

1937 births
2013 deaths
Ferenc
Nobility from Budapest
Hungarian emigrants to Austria
Hungarian emigrants to Canada